María del Carmen Asurmendi Villaverde (born 4 April 1986) is a Spanish basketball player who plays as a point guard for Araski AES.

Career
Asurmendi was born in Pamplona. She made her debut in the Liga Femenina in the 2006–07 season with Arranz Jopisa Burgos and has played in several clubs of the Spanish top division.

International career

She has played with the U-21 Spanish national team in the World Championship of such category which was played in Moscow in 2007.

Awards and accomplishments
 Spanish Cup: (1)
 2016 with CB Conquero
 Spanish League: (1)
 2015–16 with CB Avenida

References

External links 
Profile en FEB.es
Profile in fibaeurope.com

1986 births
Living people
Sportspeople from Pamplona
Spanish women's basketball players
Point guards
Spanish women's 3x3 basketball players